Umbach is a surname of German origin. Notable people with the surname include:

Arnold Umbach (1942–2020), American baseball player
Jonas Umbach (c. 1624–1693), German painter, designer, and engraver

References

Surnames of German origin